Stilfs is a comune (municipality) in the province of South Tyrol in northern Italy. It is located near the northern ramp of the Stelvio Pass.

The municipality of Stilfs contains the frazioni (subdivisions, mainly villages and hamlets) Sulden, Trafoi, Gomagoi.

History

Coat-of-arms
The emblem shows an or disc on sable background; inside the disc is a six leaves star of azure, vert and gules alternating. The star symbolizes an ancient nightly custom in wintertime. The emblem was granted in 1969.

Society

Linguistic distribution
According to the 2011 census, 98.46% of the population speak German and 1.54% Italian as first language.

Demographic evolution

Notable people
 Roland Thöni (born in Trafoi, 1951–2021) was an Alpine ski racer. Competed in the downhill at the 1976 Winter Olympics, won by Franz Klammer.

See also
 Stelvio National Park

References

External links
 Homepage of the municipality

Municipalities of South Tyrol